Phebe Marr (born September 21, 1931) is a prominent American historian of modern Iraq with the Middle East Institute.

She has been research professor at the National Defense University and a retired professor of history at University of Tennessee and Stanislaus State University in California.

Academic career
Marr received a Ph.D. in Middle Eastern history from Harvard University and a master's in Middle East studies from Radcliffe College.

Professional career
Marr is currently on the board of directors at the Middle East Policy Council, a Washington, D.C.-based organization that seeks to educate American citizens and policy-makers about Middle East issues and Islam. She also serves on the board of directors of the Hollings Center for International Dialogue, an NGO that works to promote dialogue between the US and predominantly Muslim countries.

Published works
Iraq's Refugee and IDP Crisis: Human Toll and Implications Middle East Institute
Iraq's New Political Map, Special Report (January 2007)
Who Are Iraq's New Leaders? What Do They Want?, Special Report (March 2006) 
Democracy in the Rough, Current History, January 2006 (PDF). 
The Modern History of Iraq (revised edition, 2012). 
Egypt at the Crossroads: Domestic Stability and Regional Rule, editor and contributor (1999). 
Riding the Tiger: The Middle East After the Cold War, editor and contributor (1993).

References

External links

Living people
21st-century American historians
University of Tennessee faculty
Radcliffe College alumni
American women historians
1931 births
21st-century American women writers